These are the official results of the men's 5000 metres event at the 1992 Summer Olympics in Barcelona, Spain. There were a total number of 62 participating athletes, with four qualifying heats. The fastest three qualified for the final plus the four fastest others.

In the final, Dieter Baumann ran past a trio of African runners, finishing the last 100 meters in 11.9 seconds to take the gold.

Medalists

Records
These were the standing world and Olympic records (in minutes) prior to the 1992 Summer Olympics.

Final
Held on August 8, 1992

Heats

Final ranking

See also
 1990 Men's European Championships 5.000 metres (Split)
 1991 Men's World Championships 5.000 metres (Tokyo)
 1993 Men's World Championships 5.000 metres (Stuttgart)
 1994 Men's European Championships 5.000 metres (Helsinki)

References

External links
 Official Report
 Results

 
5000 metres at the Olympics
Men's events at the 1992 Summer Olympics